Yunnanin A is a biologically active cyclic peptide.

References

Cyclic peptides